El Valle Airport is located in El Valle, a town in the Hato Mayor province of the Dominican Republic. It is an alternative for Sabana de la Mar Airport, and serves as a domestic airport without regular scheduled services.

See also 
 Sabana de la Mar Airport

References

External links 
 

Airports in the Dominican Republic
Buildings and structures in Hato Mayor Province